In hydrology, a debouch (or debouche) is a place where runoff from a small, confined space discharges into a larger, broader body of water. The word is derived from the French verb déboucher, which means "to unblock, to clear". The term also has a military usage.

Geology
In fluvial geomorphology, a debouch is a place where runoff from a small, confined space emerges into a larger, broader space. Common examples are when a stream runs into a river or when a river runs into an ocean. Debouching can generate massive amounts of sediment transport. When a narrow stream travels down a mountain pass into a basin, an alluvial fan will form from the mass deposit of the sediment. The four largest rivers (the Amazon, the Ganges-Brahmaputra, the Yangtze and the Yellow) are responsible for 20% of the global discharge of sediment in to the oceans by debouches.

Geography
In fluvial geography, a debouch is a place where a body of water pours forth from a narrow opening. Some examples are: where a river or stream emerges from a narrow constraining landform, such as a defile, into open country or a wider space; a creek joins a river; or a stream flows into a lake.

Military
In military usage of debouch: as a noun, a fortification at the end of a defile is sometimes known as a debouch; and as a verb, soldiers emerging from a narrow space and spreading out are also said to "debouch".

See also
Fluvial landforms of streams
Region of freshwater influence

References

External links

Fluvial landforms
Rivers
Water streams
Military terminology